Juan Gómez-Quiñones (January 28, 1940 – November 11, 2020) was an American historian, professor of history, poet, and activist. He was best known for his work in the field of Chicana/o history. As a co-editor of the Plan de Santa Bárbara, an educational manifesto for the implementation of Chicano studies programs in universities nationwide, he was an influential figure in the development of the field.

Youth and education
Gómez-Quiñones was born in the city of Parral, Chihuahua, Mexico, and raised in East Los Angeles. He graduated from Cantwell Sacred Heart of Mary School, a Catholic high school in Montebello, California. He subsequently attended the University of California, Los Angeles, earning his bachelor's degree in literature, his Master of Arts in Latin American studies, and his doctorate of philosophy in history. His 1972 dissertation was titled "Social Change and Intellectual Discontent: The Growth of Mexican Nationalism, 1890-1911."

He was a founding co-editor of Aztlán, a journal of Chicano studies.
He began teaching at the University of California, Los Angeles in 1969 and has held his post for over forty years. He has served as the director of UCLA's Chicano Studies Research Center, as well as on the board of the Mexican American Legal Defense and Education Fund.

Honors and awards
(1966–1968) Foreign Area Fellow. Sponsored by the Social Science Research Council and the American Council of Learned Societies
(1990) Scholar of the Year Award from the National Association of Chicana and Chicano Studies
National Endowment for the Humanities Fellow

Bibliography

References

External links
Juan Gomez-Quinones UCLA faculty profile

1940 births
2020 deaths
21st-century American historians
American male non-fiction writers
Mexican emigrants to the United States
American academics of Mexican descent
People from Chihuahua (state)
University of California, Los Angeles alumni
University of California, Los Angeles faculty
People from East Los Angeles, California
People from Montebello, California
Historians from California
21st-century American male writers